The following is a list of songs sung by singer Alka Yagnik:

1980s

1980

1981

1982

1983

1984

1985

1986

1987

1988

1989

1990s

1990

1991

1992

1993

1994

1995

1996

1997

1998

1999

2000s

2000

2001

2002

2003

2004

2005

2006

2007

2008

2009

2010s

2010

2011

2012

2013

2014

2015

2016

2017

2019

2020s

2020

2021 

Year 2022
2633 Khudbudi Khwabon ki kahaniyan Solo

Replaced film songs

Non-film songs

Hindi TV Serial songs

Urdu film songs

Other Indian languages

Assamese songs

Bengali songs

Bhojpuri songs

English songs

Gujarati songs

Malayalam songs

Punjabi songs

Tamil songs

Telugu songs

Oriya songs

Non-film songs

References

Lists of songs recorded by Indian singers